Benson Omala Ochieng is a Kenyan Striker who features for Kenyan Premier League side Gor Mahia F.C.. He formerly turned out for Western Stima F.C. and Swedish division one side FC Linköping City. 

Omala, the current top scorer in the 2022–23 Kenyan Premier League, also featured for the Kenya U-20 and U-23 sides, and is a member of the Kenya national football team.

References

External links
 Omala at Flash Score

2001 births
Living people
Kenyan footballers
Western Stima F.C. players
Gor Mahia F.C. players
Kenyan Premier League players